Santiago Mostajo Gutiérrez (15 September 1932 – 11 January 2005) was a Spanish professional cyclist. His best result was a stage in at the 1957 Volta a Catalunya, when he arrived alone in Granollers. At the end of the 1950s, he acquired Campo del Guinardó and rebuilt the race track around the playing field.

Biography
Santiago was born in Zaragoza, Spain on September 15, 1932. His father Santiago Mostajo Trigo was also a professional cyclist. He competed with the Faema-Guerra team during 1950s and won the Borràs Trophy in 1953 and one stage of the Volta a Catalunya in 1957.  He collaborated with his father on the management of the Mostajo velodrome at the Camp del Guinardó in Barcelona, where a cycling school was set up. In 1978 he was proclaimed runner-up in the masters world championship.

Major results

1952
 National Track Championships
1st  Sprint
1st  Points race
 3rd Trofeo Jaumendreu
1953
1st Trofeo Borràs
1956
 1st Stage 1 Vuelta a Mallorca
1957
 1st Stage 7 Volta a Catalunya

References

External links
 

1932 births
2005 deaths
Sportspeople from Zaragoza
Spanish male cyclists
Cyclists from Aragon